Three Creeks, One Will is an outdoor 2013 sculpture by Devin Laurence Field, installed in Beaverton, Oregon, United States.

Description and history
Field's design was selected from a dozen candidates and unanimously approved by the Beaverton Artist Selection Committee in March 2013. The piece was installed on October 29, 2013. According to the artist, the blue and green cylindrical sculpture is inspired by the city's three creeks and serves as a tribute to Beaverton's history and future.

See also
 2013 in art
 List of public art in Beaverton, Oregon

References

2013 establishments in Oregon
2013 sculptures
Outdoor sculptures in Beaverton, Oregon